The South African Railways Class 61-000 of 1959 was a diesel-hydraulic locomotive.

Between May and July 1959, the South African Railways placed seven  Henschel type DH-1420 diesel-hydraulic locomotives in service to also gain experience with other forms of diesel motive power than diesel-electric. The locomotives were later reclassified to Class . In 1971, six of them were sold to Rhodesia Railways.

Manufacturer
The Class 61-000 type DH-1420 diesel-hydraulic locomotive was designed and built for the South African Railways (SAR) by Henschel & Son in Kassel, Germany. Upon delivery, the locomotives were designated Class  and numbered in the range from D745 to D751 in the non-steam locomotive number range which had hitherto been used almost exclusively for electric locomotives, the exceptions being the Class DS, Class DS1 and Class 1-DE diesel-electric locomotives. After the SAR adopted a new classification and numbering system for diesel-powered locomotives upon the arrival of the Class 32-000 later in 1959, they were reclassified as the Class 61-000 and renumbered in the range from 61-001 to 61-007.

The Class 1-DH was acquired a year after the SAR had acquired its first diesel-electric locomotives to be built in quantity, the Class  which had entered service in 1958 and which was later reclassified to Class 31-000. At the time, the SAR was still making extensive use of steam traction and increasing use of electric traction. Its first mainline diesel traction acquisitions were therefore the diesel-electric Class 1-DE and diesel-hydraulic Class 1-DH to gain experience with both forms of diesel motive power.

Diesel-hydraulic transmission
The more commonly used diesel-electric locomotive makes use of a diesel engine prime mover to propel either a generator (DC) or an alternator (AC) to generate electric power, which is then used to propel axle-hung electric traction motors, one per powered axle, to drive the locomotive wheels. It therefore works on the same general principle as a regular electric locomotive, the main difference being that it generates its own electric power instead of collecting it from an external supply such as overhead catenary or a third rail.

Diesel-hydraulic locomotives, on the other hand, use hydrokinetic transmission, also known as hydrodynamic transmission, in the form of torque converters to transmit power from prime mover to wheels.

Characteristics
The Class 61-000 was a centre-cab locomotive which was powered by two General Motors Electro-Motive Division (GM-EMD) type 6/567C V6 prime movers, each with a Voith type L306r triple-torque converter transmission and each driving the wheels of one bogie. Power was transferred to the axles through drive shafts. Unlike diesel-electric locomotives where each axle is driven by its own traction motor, individual wheel-slip was not possible on the Class  since each bogie's two axles were interconnected through the drive shafts.

The cab had two control stands and since it was possible to start the six prime movers of three multiple-unit consisted locomotives from one engine cab, each control stand had six engine start buttons and six engine stop buttons. The electrical system was very complicated and unreliable, which eventually led to the locomotives being completely rewired in 1963.

The diesel-hydraulics were acquired to enable a direct comparison with the Class 31-000 General Electric-built diesel-electrics, but these Henschel machines did not perform as well. This was disappointing given the acknowledged success of diesel-hydraulic traction in Germany. Although it has been surmised that the much higher ambient temperatures in South Africa might have been a factor, an improved cooling system could probably have solved that if it had been the main problem.

Service

South African Railways
From its establishment in late 1958, the new diesel depot in Germiston provided most of the power on goods trains and some passenger trains going south from the Reef to Volksrust and Kroonstad. Upon delivery, the Class  joined the Class  there. They were initially tried on passenger trains, but after a failure at Standerton due to overheating while working the Trans-Natal Express, they were taken off further passenger work and used on goods trains only. They were not successful in mainline goods working either and in the early 1960s the new diesel-hydraulics were mostly confined to shunting work in yards around Braamfontein.

The Class 61-000s spent their entire SAR working lives stationed at the Germiston diesel depot. One of them, no. 61-006} was involved in a head-on collision at Kaserne on 8 October 1966 and was eventually scrapped at the Koedoespoort workshops in Pretoria in September 1968. Problems with cracked axles eventually resulted in the rest of the fleet being staged for repairs in 1967.

Rhodesia Railways
In 1971, the remaining six locomotives were sold to Rhodesia Railways (RR), later renamed the National Railways of Zimbabwe (NRZ), where they became the RR Class DH1 and were renumbered in the range from 3101 to 3106.

ZISCO
They were eventually resold to the Zimbabwe Iron and Steel Company steel works at KweKwe in Zimbabwe. Most, if not all, were scrapped by 2001.

Liveries
Like the Class  diesel-electrics, the locomotives were delivered in a livery that displayed the colours of the South African flag, white on the upper half and blue on the lower half, separated by an orange stripe on the sides and orange whiskers on the ends. They had black running boards, red buffer beams and black cowcatchers. From 1960 this livery gradually began to be replaced by Gulf Red with yellow side-stripes on the hoods and a yellow V on each end.

Works numbers
The Class 61-000 builder's works numbers, renumbering upon reclassification and sale are listed in the table.

Illustration

References

External links

3550
B-B locomotives
Henschel locomotives
Cape gauge railway locomotives
Railway locomotives introduced in 1959